Paolo Naldini may refer to:

 Pietro Paolo Naldini (1619–1691), Italian sculptor
 Paolo Naldini (bishop) (1632–1713), bishop of Capodistria